Ahmet Can Arık (born 22 August 1997) is a Turkish footballer who plays as a midfielder for TFF Third League club 23 Elazığ FK.

Professional career
Arık made his professional debut with Ankaragücü in a 2-0 Süper Lig loss to Çaykur Rizespor on 25 October 2019.

References

External links
 
 
 

1997 births
People from Sincan, Ankara
Living people
Turkish footballers
Association football midfielders
MKE Ankaragücü footballers
Süper Lig players
TFF Second League players
TFF Third League players